The Killey Bridge Formation is a geologic formation in Northern Ireland. It preserves fossils dating back to the Ordovician period.

See also

 List of fossiliferous stratigraphic units in Northern Ireland

References
 

Ordovician Northern Ireland
Ordovician southern paleotemperate deposits